The Portage Industrial Waterfront Historic District is in Portage, Wisconsin.

Description
The district includes several commercial structures in the low-lying area along the Portage Canal. Among them are the 1862 Wentworth Grain Elevator, the 1881 Portage Hosiery complex, the 1891 Portage Iron Works, the 1916 T.H. Cochrane Company Warehouse, and the 1920 Hyland Garage.

References

Historic districts on the National Register of Historic Places in Wisconsin
National Register of Historic Places in Columbia County, Wisconsin